Big City Nights is a compilation album by the German heavy metal band Scorpions, released in 1998.

The song "No One Like You" is listed as a live version on the album. However, on some pressings, the track is replaced with the studio version.

Track listing 
"Big City Nights" - 4:09 (from the album Love at First Sting - 1984)
"Animal Magnetism" - 5:57 (from the album Animal Magnetism - 1980)
"Send Me an Angel" - 4:43 (from the album Crazy World - 1990)
"Rock You Like a Hurricane" (live) - 4:13 (from the album World Wide Live - 1985)
"Still Loving You" (live) - 5:49 (from the album World Wide Live)
"No One Like You" (live) - 4:09 (from the album World Wide Live)
"Wind of Change" (live) - 5:45 (from the album Live Bites - 1995)
"Kicks After Six" - 3:49 (from the album Crazy World)
"Rhythm of Love" - 3:48 (from the album Savage Amusement - 1988)
"No Pain, No Gain" - 3:54 (from the album Face the Heat - 1993)
"Can't Live Without You" - 3:45 (from the album Blackout - 1982)

References

1998 compilation albums
Scorpions (band) compilation albums